The NCAA Men's Outdoor Track and Field Championship refers to one of three annual collegiate outdoor track and field competitions for men organised by the National Collegiate Athletic Association (NCAA) for athletes from institutions that make up its three divisions: Division I, II, and III. In each event athlete's individual performances earn points for their institution and the team with the most points receives the NCAA team title in track and field.
NCAA Division I Men's Outdoor Track and Field Championships
NCAA Division II Men's Outdoor Track and Field Championships
NCAA Division III Men's Outdoor Track and Field Championships

A separate NCAA women's competition is also held.

See also
NCAA Men's Indoor Track and Field Championship
NCAA Women's Indoor Track and Field Championship
NCAA Women's Outdoor Track and Field Championship

 
 Outdoor